Tinolius eburneigutta is a moth of the family Erebidae first described by Francis Walker in 1855. It is found in India, Sri Lanka, and Thailand.

Description
The male has strongly bipectinate (comb-like on both sides) antennae. Caterpillars are known to feed on Thunbergia species.

Larval food plants

 Thunbergia alata - Sri Lanka
 Thunbergia grandiflora - Indian subregion
 Thunbergia mysorensis - India

References

Moths of Asia
Moths described in 1855